Soul Brothers is the third album recorded by Ray Charles and the eleventh album by Milt Jackson and released by Atlantic Records in 1958. The album was later re-issued in a two-CD compilation together with the other Charles–Jackson album Soul Meeting and included additional tracks from the same recording sessions not present on the original LP releases.

Track listing
All songs composed by Ray Charles except where noted.

Original LP release
Side A
 "Soul Brothers" (Quincy Jones) – 9:34
 "How Long, How Long Blues" (Leroy Carr) – 9:15

Side B
 "Cosmic Ray" – 5:21
 "Blue Funk" – 8:09
 "Bag's Guitar Blues" (Milt Jackson) – 6:23 [mono LP release]
 "'Deed I Do" (Walter Hirsch, Fred Rose) – 5:50 [stereo LP release]

CD re-issue/compilation
Disc one
 "How Long, How Long Blues" Leroy Carr – 9:16
 "Cosmic Ray" – 5:23
 "The Genius After Hours" – 5:24
 "Charlesville" – 4:55
 "Bags of Blues" (Jackson) – 8:50
 "'Deed I Do" (Hirsch, Rose) – 5:50
 "Blue Funk" – 8:05

Disc two
 "Soul Brothers" (Jones) – 9:34
 "Bag's Guitar Blues" (Jackson) – 6:27
 "Soul Meeting" (Jackson) – 6:04
 "Hallelujah, I Love Her" So – 5:29
 "Blue Genius" – 6:40
 "X-Ray Blues" – 8:10
 "Love on My Mind" – 3:45

Personnel
Ray Charles – piano, alto saxophone
Milt Jackson – vibraphone, piano, guitar
Billy Mitchell – tenor saxophone
Skeeter Best – guitar
Oscar Pettiford – bass
Connie Kay – drums

Production
Tom Dowd – recording engineer
Marvin Israel – cover design
Lee Friedlander – photography

References

External links
Soul Brothers at discogs.com
[ Soul Brothers] at AllMusic.com

1958 albums
Ray Charles albums
Milt Jackson albums
Albums produced by Nesuhi Ertegun
Atlantic Records albums
Collaborative albums